Woodcutters of the Deep South is the sixth and final feature-length film produced and directed by American independent filmmaker Lionel Rogosin. The film looks at the white and black American workers of the Gulf Coast Pulpwood Association who seek to overcome poor working conditions and "exploitation from pulpwood corporations".

See also
 List of American films of 1973

References

External links 
 

1973 films
American documentary films
Films directed by Lionel Rogosin
Documentary films about labor relations in the United States
1973 documentary films
1970s English-language films
1970s American films